David W. Butler High School (commonly referred to as "Butler") was established in 1997 and is located in Matthews, North Carolina, United States. The mascot is the bulldog and school colors are black, red and silver.

Its boundary includes: most of Matthews, and a portion of Mint Hill.

History

2018 Shooting 
At around 7:10 AM on October 29, 2018, an altercation between two students occurred in front of a main hallway known as 500. This led to one student being shot two to three times and triggering a lockdown that was lifted by 9:15 AM EDT. The victim, identified as Bobby McKeithen, was rushed to Carolinas Medical Center by helicopter, later dying of his injuries. The suspect, identified as Jatwan Cuffie, is currently out on bail and charged with second degree murder. After he shot McKeithen he came into a 500 hall classroom when the lockdown was called and turned himself in to a campus security officer minutes later, handing the gun over to him. In the weeks following, trained crisis counselors were available on campus as well as several police officers and police dogs to help keep everything safe. Although the police presence has decreased, the school has now implemented a strict security system consisting of random bag checks and metal wanding.
The school, as of May 29, 2019, set up a memorial plaque in honor of McKeithen in the main entrance on the left side. On July 25, 2019, Cuffie pled guilty to voluntary manslaughter and was sentenced to 80 to 108 months in prison. There was another shooting in 2010 with a nail gun through the front office window. No one was charged and nothing was done about it.

Cheerleading Banner Controversy 
On October 19, 2021, at the beginning of a football game against Charlotte Catholic High School, the David W. Butler High School Cheerleading team displayed a banner that read "Sniff, Sniff. You smell that? $Privilege$". The Butler football team then broke through the banner as they entered the field to begin the game. Charlotte-Mecklenburg Schools stated that they were investigating the incident and issued the following statement to WCNC Charlotte: "CMS is aware of an insensitive banner displayed by the Butler HS cheerleading squad prior to the school’s football game versus Charlotte Catholic last Friday. Squad members and adults responsible for oversight will face consequences as a result of that banner display. School and district officials will offer no specific information about this disciplinary matter. Principal Golden and Learning Community Superintendent Tangela Williams have spoken with leaders from Charlotte Catholic to offer verbal apologies. Butler High School cheerleaders have sent an apology letter to counterparts at Charlotte Catholic. Soon there will be a meeting between the schools’ cheerleading squads to facilitate goodwill and understanding."

Athletics

Football 
Butler's football team won three North Carolina High School Athletic Association (NCHSAA) 4AA State Championships in a four year span, during the 2009, 2010, and 2012 seasons. In 2009, Butler won its first 4AA State Championship title at Carter-Finley Stadium defeating Jack Britt High School 48–17. In 2010, Butler repeated as North Carolina State 4AA Champions by defeating Rolesville High School 44–0, finishing the season on a 31-game winning streak. In 2012, Butler again defeated Jack Britt High School 56–28 at Kenan Stadium in Chapel Hill, winning the NC 4AA state title for the 3rd time in 4 seasons. Butler finished the 2012 season undefeated and ranked number 1 in North Carolina and number 3 in the final USA Today 2012 National Super 25 Football Poll. In June 2019, MaxPreps reported that Butler was North Carolina's "Most Dominant High School Football Program of the last 10 years."

Softball 
During the 2000s, the softball team won four 4A state championships, winning in 2001, 2006, 2007, and 2008.

Wrestling 
Butler's wrestling team finished 4th in the NCHSAA 4A dual team tournament during the 2007–2008 season. During the 2008–2009 season, Butler wrestling finished as the 4A dual team state runner-ups.

Girls' basketball 
Butler's girls' basketball team won the NCHSAA 4A state championship in 2009–10, and went 30–0 the following season before a premature loss to Mallard Creek in the Class 4A Western Regional semifinals, cutting their chance at a repeat short.

Notable alumni 
 Jamar Adams, NFL safety
 Tyler Barnhardt, actor
 Robert Blanton, NFL safety
 Jarrett Boykin, NFL and CFL wide receiver
 Cierra Burdick, former basketball player in the WNBA
 Brooklyn Decker, model and actress
 Jahwan Edwards, football running back
 Riley Ferguson, football quarterback
 Brandon Hucks, musician with Of Good Nature
Peter Kalambayi, NFL Linebacker
 Kendall Lamm, NFL offensive tackle
 Jordan Lloyd, winner of Big Brother 11 and Big Brother 13 houseguest
 Kenneth Moore, NFL wide receiver
 Jordan Rinaldi, mixed martial artist fighter who competed in the featherweight division of the UFC
 Channing Stribling, football defensive back

References

External links 
 

Public high schools in North Carolina
Schools in Mecklenburg County, North Carolina
Educational institutions established in 1997
1997 establishments in North Carolina